14th FFCC Awards
December 21, 2009

Best Picture:
 Up in the Air 
The 14th Florida Film Critics Circle Awards were given on December 21, 2009.

Winners
Best Actor:
 George Clooney - Up in the Air
Best Actress:
 Gabourey Sidibe - Precious
Best Animated Film:
 Up
Best Cinematography:
 Avatar - Mauro Fiore
Best Director:
 Jason Reitman - Up in the Air
Best Documentary Film:
 The Cove
Best Film:
 Up in the Air
Best Foreign Language Film:
 Sin Nombre • Spain
Best Screenplay:
 500 Days of Summer - Scott Neustadter and Michael Weber
Best Supporting Actor:
 Christoph Waltz - Inglourious Basterds
Best Supporting Actress:
 Mo'Nique - Precious
Pauline Kael Breakout Award:
 Gabourey Sidibe - Precious

2000s
2009 film awards